Claudia Mandia (born ) is an Italian female recurve archer and part of the national team.

She won the bronze medal at the 2016 World Indoor Archery Championships in the women's individual event.

References

External links
 
 https://www.youtube.com/watch?v=eA1LIU0SvdQv
 http://www.gettyimages.com/photos/claudia-mandia?excludenudity=true&sort=mostpopular&mediatype=photography&phrase=claudia%20mandia
 http://www.the-sports.org/claudia-mandia-archery-spf287362.html

1992 births
People from Battipaglia
Living people
Italian female archers
Place of birth missing (living people)
Olympic archers of Italy
Archers at the 2016 Summer Olympics
Mediterranean Games gold medalists for Italy
Mediterranean Games medalists in archery
Competitors at the 2013 Mediterranean Games
Archers of Fiamme Azzurre
Sportspeople from the Province of Salerno
21st-century Italian women